Richard de Montfort (Montfort l'Amaury, Ile de France, France – 1092), was the son of Simon I de Montfort, Count of Évreux (c. 1025–1087) and Agnès d'Évreux (c. 1030 – c. 1087), daughter of Richard, Count of Évreux.

He succeeded his half brother Amaury II in 1089 as lord of Montfort-l'Amaury. In November 1092, he was killed in battle.

Orderic Vitalis records that he succeeded his half-brother in 1089 and "was relentless in his attempts to take vengeance on William of Breteuil for Amaury's fate".  He was mortally wounded in an attack on Conches-en-Ouche during the war between Raoul III de Tosny and William, Count of Évreux triggered by the enmity between their wives.

He died without an heir and left Montfort to his brother, Simon II. He was buried in Épernon, Eure-et-Loir, France.

References 

Richard
1092 deaths
Year of birth uncertain
Seigneur of Montfort